Lu Sidao (531–582) was a Chinese poet of the Sui dynasty.  He was from Fanyang Commandery which is now part of modern Beijing.

References

Sui dynasty poets
Sui dynasty politicians
531 births
582 deaths
Poets from Beijing
Politicians from Beijing
6th-century Chinese poets
Male poets
Lu clan of Fanyang
6th-century Chinese writers